The 2019 Spain Triangular T20I Series was a cricket tournament held in Spain from 29 to 31 March 2019. The tournament featured the national teams of Spain and Malta, as well as an Estonia XI. All matches were played at La Manga Club, near to the city of Cartagena in the Region of Murcia.

The matches played between Spain and Malta had Twenty20 International (T20I) status, with both teams making their debuts in the format after the International Cricket Council announced that all matches played between Associate Members from 1 January 2019 would have T20I status. The Estonian XI was not an official national side. Spain won the series after all three games on the final day were abandoned with no play possible due to rain.

Squads

Points table
{| class="wikitable" style="text-align:center"
|-
! style="width:175px;"|
! style="width:20px;"|
! style="width:20px;"|
! style="width:20px;"|
! style="width:20px;"|
! style="width:20px;"|
! style="width:20px;"|
! style="width:65px;"|
|-style="background:#cfc;"  
| style="text-align:left" | 
| 6 || 4 || 0 || 0 || 2 || 10 || +4.880
|-
| style="text-align:left" | 
| 6 || 2 || 2 || 0 || 2 || 6 || –0.689
|-
| style="text-align:left" | 
| 6 || 0 || 4 || 0 || 2 || 2 || –3.721
|}

Fixtures

References

External links
 Series home at ESPN Cricinfo

2019 in Spanish sport
2019 in Estonian sport
2019 in Maltese sport
International cricket competitions in 2018–19